The Doug Moran National Portrait Prize is an annual Australian portrait prize founded by Doug Moran in 1988, the year of Australia's Bicentenary. It is the richest portrait prize in the world with A$150,000 awarded to the winner. The prize is acquisitive; "the winning portrait immediately becomes the property of the Moran Arts Foundation, to be exhibited permanently as part of the Moran Arts Foundation Collection".

The aim of the competition is to promote contemporary Australian portraiture and, as such, entry conditions stipulate that both the artist and their subject be an Australian citizen or resident for at least one year prior to the closing date for entries, however it is not required that the artist or the subject be well known.

There was a court case in 2002–2004 involving the Moran family and the Tweed Shire Council, which ended with an out of court settlement. Following this, there was no longer a $1,000 prize paid to the 30 finalists who did not win, and no longer an international judge. This has now changed back and finalists again receive $1,000.

List of winners 

1988 – Penny Dowie – Caitlin
1990 – Robert Hannaford – Bill
1992 – Siv Grava – Self portrait 
1994 – Josonia Palaitis – John Mills 
1996 – Greg Creek – Picture of Carolyn Eskdale, 1996 
1998 – Esther Erlich – Gaunt and glorious – Steve Moneghetti
2000 – Kristin Headlam – Self-portrait in bed with the animals
2002 – David Fairbairn – Red Portrait Suzanne
2004 – Prudence Flint – A Fine Romance #9
2006 – Peter Wegner – Wounded Poet 2006
2007 – Leslie Rice – Self Portrait 2007
2008 – Fiona Lowry – What I Assume You Shall Assume (Self-portrait)
2009 – Ben Quilty – There but for the Grace of God Go I, no.2
2010 – Michael Zavros – Phoebe is dead
2011 – Vincent Fantauzzo – Off Screen portrait of Baz Luhrmann
2012 – Leslie Rice – Self Portrait (with the Muses of Painting and Poetry)
2013 – Nigel Milsom – Uncle Paddy 
2014 – Louise Hearman – Bill-1383
2015 – Warren Crossett – Self Portrait after St Jerome Flanders
2016 – Megan Seres – Scarlett as Colonial Girl
2017 – Tim Storrier – The Lunar Savant, a portrait of McLean Edwards.
2018 – Lynn Savery – Lynn Savery: self-portrait
2019 – what – Robert Forster
2020 – no award
2021
Vincent Fantauzzo – Muse
Andrew Greensmith – Two lives one soul
Michael Vale – Our ghostly crew
2022 - Graeme Drendel - Portrait of Lewis Miller

Moran Contemporary Photographic Prize

The Moran Contemporary Photographic Prize was set in motion in 2007 by the Moran Arts Foundation. This Prize is exhibited at the same time as the Portrait Prize and consists of three sections; Open, Secondary Schools and Primary Schools. Entrants are asked to interpret ‘Contemporary life in Australia’, with an emphasis on Australian's going about their day-to-day lives.

There is a total prize pool of A$100,000, with $50,000 awarded to the winner of the Open division and $1,000 awarded to each of the 30 Finalists. The Secondary division is split into three sections; 7–8 (winner receives $2,000), 9–10 (winner receives $3,000) and 11–12 (winner receives $5,000). Each winner's school wins the same amount for the development of the arts at the school. The 30 finalists of the Primary division each receive a digital camera.

Photography Workshop Program

The Moran Arts Foundation Photography Workshop Program commenced in 2007 and is part of the Moran Contemporary Photographic Prize.

The free workshops are run by professional photographers at schools Australia wide. Each student is given a digital camera to work with for the day along with guidance from the professional photographer. Basic photography skills are taught along the theme of ‘Visual Storytelling’ and the student's print their favourite shots of the day. In 2015 there were 112 digital photography workshops across Australia in urban, rural and remote areas. Out of the 112 workshops 21 were held in remote areas.

Photographic Prize winners

Open Section
 2007 – Ben Searcy – Waiting for News on David -Terry and Bev Hicks on the five-year anniversary of David's detainment
 2008 – Belinda Mason – Four Generations
 2009 – Dean Sewell – A Dry Argument
 2010 – Dean Sewell – Cockatoo Island Ferry
 2011 – Jack Atley  – Steve Waugh and Sarah Walker
 2012 – Ashleigh Bradley  – Marti, Surfer, Jacqui Stockdale, Rama-Jaara Royal Shepherdess, Kelsey Austin Walsh, The World Inside My Mind, Tobias Titz, Noel Charlie
 2013 – John Janson-Moore  – Nyrripi girl with finger
 2014 – Suzanne McCorkell  – Time out from training
 2015 – Trent Mitchell  – Boy in Boat, Hervey Bay, QLD 2015
 2016 – Johannes Reinhart – "Mermaid Show"
 2018 - James Bugg - "Zach"
 2019 - Tamara Dean - "Endangered"

Schools Section (Secondary, Years 11 and 12)
2007 – Ronnie Ling The Usual Suspects
2008 – Alex Case Where You've Been Hiding

Schools Section (Secondary, Years 9 and 10)
2007 – Ronald Au Otamop
2008 – Larissa Enright Sinking

Schools Section (Secondary, Years 7 and 8)
2007 – Vonny Chui Constant Change
2008 – Alden Leong Pollution

References

External links 
Moran Prizes website
Major awards for our finest photos

 
Awards established in 1988
1988 establishments in Australia
Australian art awards